The Harris Mountain Fire is a wildfire that started near Cascade, Montana on July 16, 2021. The fire has burned  and is 20% contained.

Events

July 
The Harris Mountain Fire was first reported on July 23, 2021, at around 12:00 pm MST.

August

Cause 
The cause of the fire is believed to be due to lightning.

Containment 
As of August 5, 2021, the Harris Mountain Fire is 20% contained.

Impact

Closures and Evacuations

References 

2021 Montana wildfires
July 2021 events in the United States
August 2021 events in the United States
Wildfires in Montana